Henrietta Catharina Luisa Schneider (tr. ; 20 January 1856 – 4 September 1918) was a Baltic German tutor at the court of Tsar Nicholas II and Tsarina Alexandra. She taught Alexandra Russian before her marriage, just as she had some years earlier taught Russian to the Tsarina's sister, Grand Duchess Elizabeth Fyodorovna before her marriage to Grand Duke Sergei Alexandrovich of Russia.

Schneider was murdered by the Bolsheviks at Perm in the fall of 1918 along with lady in waiting Anastasia Hendrikova. Schneider and Hendrikova were canonized as martyrs by the Russian Orthodox Church Outside Russia in 1981, in spite of the fact she was a Lutheran.

Biography
Schneider, nicknamed "Trina," was born in Saint Petersburg to a Baltic German family and was the niece of the former imperial physician Dr. Hirsch. Her father was a Hof-Councillor. A courtier remembered her as "infinitely sweet tempered and good hearted." Schneider was also primly Victorian. She once refused to permit the four grand duchesses to put on a play because it contained the word "stockings." Schneider was devoted to the Empress and willingly followed her into imprisonment following the Russian Revolution of 1917. She was separated from the family at Ekaterinburg and imprisoned for months at Perm. In September 1918 the elderly Schneider and the thirty-one-year-old Hendrikova were driven to a forest outside Perm, told to march forward, and were killed with a rifle butt.

The bodies of Hendrikova and Schneider were recovered by the Whites in May 1919, though the whereabouts of their final resting place remains a mystery.

See also
New Martyr
Romanov sainthood

Notes

 Rappaport, Helen. Four Sisters: The Lost Lives of the Romanov Grand Duchesses. Pan Macmillan, 2014.

External links

ROCOR

1856 births
1918 deaths
Canonised servants of the Romanov household
Baltic-German people
German people executed abroad
20th-century executions by Russia
Eastern Orthodox Christians from Germany
Executed German women
20th-century Christian saints
Christian female saints of the Late Modern era
Court of Nicholas II of Russia